The 2001 V8Star Series season was the inaugural V8Star Series season. It featured nine races at five European racing circuits, in Germany and Austria. Venezuelan ex-Formula One and Grand Prix motorcycle racing driver Johnny Cecotto was crowned champion of the series, taking four wins, and beating Germans Marcel Tiemann and Roland Asch to the title.

Teams and drivers

Race calendar and results

Championship standings

References

External links
driverdb.com V8Star Series 2001
speedsport-magazine.com V8Star Series 2001
motorsport-archive.com V8Star Series
V8Star Series official website

V8Star Series
V8Star Series